The Wash (The Original Motion Picture Soundtrack) is the soundtrack to DJ Pooh's 2001 comedy film The Wash. It was released on November 6, 2001 by Aftermath Entertainment, Doggy Style Records, and Interscope Records. Composed of seventeen tracks, the album featured performances from film stars Dr. Dre and Snoop Dogg, among other hip hop and R&B artists, such as Bilal, Bubba Sparxxx, Busta Rhymes, D12, Joe Beast, Knoc-turn'al, LaToiya Williams, Soopafly, Truth Hurts and Xzibit. Production was handled by several record producers, including Bryan-Michael Cox, Focus..., Hi-Tek, James Poyser, Megahertz, Mel-Man, Timbaland and Vikter Duplaix.

The album peaked at number 19 in the Billboard 200 and moved 785,000 units, achieving gold status by the Recording Industry Association of America on February 28, 2002. The recording won the 2002 Stony Award for Best Soundtrack.

Two singles were released from the album: "Bad Intentions" on January 7, 2002, and "The Wash", on March 18, 2002.

Track listing 

Notes
Track 5 contains an interpolation from "Hollywood Hot" as recorded by Bob Crewe & Cinou Bullens
Track 10 contains samples from "Mercy Mercy Me" and "God Is Love" as recorded by Marvin Gaye
Track 14 contains a sample from "Get This Money" as recorded by Slum Village (originally a Herbie Hancock sample)

Tracks from the original motion picture 
 "(Not Just) Knee Deep" - Funkadelic
 "Climax" - Ohio Players
 "Rapture" - Blondie
 "Take a Little Time" - Terrell C. Moses
 "No Other Love" - Faith Evans
 "I Ain't No Joke" - Eric Barrier and William Griffin
 "Encore Work Slow Evil" - Dr. Dre, Scott Storch & Mike Elizondo (incidental music)
 "Yo Ho" - Dr. Dre & Camara Kambon (Instrumental)
 "2080 Guitar Beat" - Dr. Dre (incidental music)
 "Track 7" - Dr. Dre, Camara Kambon, Scott Storch & Mike Elizondo (incidental music)

Personnel 

Andre Romelle Young – performer (tracks: 1, 5, 17), keyboards (track 15), producer (tracks: 8, 15, 17), co-producer (track 5), mixing (tracks: 1, 2, 5, 8, 15, 17)
Calvin Cordozar Broadus Jr. – performer (tracks: 1, 17)
Shaunta Montgomery – performer (tracks: 2, 10)
Shari Watson – performer (track 2), additional vocals (track 8)
Denaun Porter – performer & drum programming (track 3)
Marshall Bruce Mathers III – performer & producer (track 3)
DeShaun Dupree Holton – performer (track 3)
Ondre Moore – performer (track 3)
Rufus Arthur Johnson – performer (track 3)
Von Carlisle – performer (track 3)
Bilal Sayeed Oliver – performer (track 4)
Royal Rosheam Harbor – performer (tracks: 5, 15)
Alvin Nathaniel Joiner – performer (track 6)
Yero Brock – performer (track 7)
Trevor Tahiem Smith – performer (track 8)
Warren Anderson Mathis – performer (track 9)
Ruben Cruz Monge – performer (track 11)
Priest Joseph Brooks – performer & keyboards (track 12), engineering & producer (tracks: 12, 14)
La'Toiya Ra'Shonne Williams – performer (track 14)
Joseph Leynard Smith – performer (track 16)
Saundralin Lee Green – additional vocals (track 1)
Barbara Wilson – additional vocals (track 5)
Diane Gordon – additional vocals (track 5)
Kathy Merrick – additional vocals (track 5)
Traci Nelson – additional vocals (tracks: 5, 17)
David Lynn Young – additional vocals (track 7)
Timothy Zachery Mosley – additional vocals, mixing & producer (track 9)
Charlene "Tweet" Keys – additional vocals (track 9)
Philip De Marks Jr. – additional vocals (track 11)
Deana Evans – additional vocals (track 15)
Kevin "Kirv" Irving – piano (track 2)
Melvin Bradford – producer (tracks: 2, 16), keyboards (track 16)
Jeffrey Irwin Bass – bass, keyboards, guitar, co-producer (track 3)
James Poyser – keyboards, mixing & producer (track 4)
Vikter Duplaix – drum programming, engineering, mixing & producer (track 4)
Michael A. Elizondo Jr. – bass (tracks: 2, 5, 8, 17), keyboards (tracks: 2, 8, 15, 16), guitar (tracks: 5, 15)
Timothy "Izo" Orindgreff – flute (track 5)
Camara Kambon – keyboards (tracks: 5, 8)
William Ed Pettaway Jr. – guitar (track 9)
Charlie Bereal – additional guitar (track 9)
Scott Spencer Storch – keyboards (tracks: 9, 13)
Tony Louis Cottrell – bass, keyboards & producer (track 10)
Bernard Edwards Jr. – bass, keyboards & producer (track 11)
Dave Aron – engineering & mixing (tracks: 12, 14), keyboards (track 14)
Don "Big June" Harris – bass (track 16)
Sean Cruse – guitar (track 17)
David L. Drew – producer (track 1)
Imsomie Leeper – producer (track 5)
Jeremy "Jay-Z" Jackson – producer (track 6)
Bryan Michael Paul Cox – producer & assistant engineering (track 7)
Jason Rome – producer (track 7)
Dorsey Wesley – producer (track 13)
Mark S. Jordan – producer (track 17)
Mauricio Iragorri – engineering (tracks: 1, 2, 5, 8, 10, 15, 17)
Richard "Segal" Huredia – engineering (tracks: 2, 6, 17), mixing (tracks: 3, 6)
Steve Baughman – engineering (tracks: 2, 10, 16), mixing (tracks: 7, 10, 16)
Claudio Cueni – engineering (track 2)
Steve King – engineering (track 3)
Tony Prendatt-Carter – engineering & mixing (track 4)
Samuel Thomas – engineering (track 7)
Steve Penny – engineering (track 9)
Joe Warlick – engineering (tracks: 10, 11), mixing (track 11)
Jimmy Douglass – engineering & mixing (track 9)
Carlos Warlick – mixing (track 10)
Duke Wagner – engineering (track 13)
Kieran Wagner – engineering (track 13)
Pop Wagner – engineering (track 13)
Jason Goldstein – mixing (track 13)
Tom Sweeney – engineering (track 15), assistant engineering (tracks: 2, 6, 17)
Keith Cohen – engineering (track 16)
Greg Burns – assistant engineering (tracks: 1, 2, 5, 8, 10)
Ted Regier – assistant engineering (tracks: 1, 10)
Urban Kris – assistant engineering (track 3)
Darrell Thorp – assistant engineering (tracks: 8, 15, 16)
Thomas Rounds – assistant engineering (tracks: 8, 17)
Jeff Kanan – assistant engineering (track 9)
Adam "Herb" Williams – assistant engineering (track 10)
Drew Thomas – assistant engineering (track 11)
Scott Whiting – assistant engineering (track 11)
John Tyree – assistant engineering (track 15)
Jeff Burns – assistant engineering (tracks: 16, 17)
Chris Gehringer – mastering (track 9)
Brian Knapp Gardner – mastering (tracks: 1–8, 10–17)
Michael Lynn – A&R
Jason Clark – art direction & design
Larry Chatman – project coordinator (tracks: 1, 2, 5, 15, 17), production management
Damon "Bing" Chatman – Aftermath project coordinator
Andrew Van Meter – Interscope project coordinator
Angelo Sanders – production management
Kirdis Tucker – product management
Lupe Ceballos – product management
Michelle Thomas – product management
Joel C. High – film music supervisor

Compilation credits
 Dr. Dre appears courtesy of Aftermath Entertainment
 Snoop Dogg appears courtesy of Doggystyle Records
 D-12 appears courtesy of Shady Records/Interscope Records
 Bilal appears courtesy of Moyo Music, Inc./Interscope Records
 Knoc-turn'Al appears courtesy of L.A. Confidential
 Xzibit appears courtesy of Open Bar Entertainment/Loud Records
 Yero appears courtesy of Noontime Music
 Busta Rhymes appears courtesy of Flipmode Records/J Records
 Bubba Sparxxx appears courtesy of Beat Club Records/Interscope Records
 Hi-Tek appears courtesy of Hi-Tek Publishing (BMI)
 RC appears courtesy of D&G Entertainment
 Soopafly appears courtesy of Fly2K Records/Doggystyle Records
 Toi appears courtesy of Fly2K Records
 Ox appears courtesy of Interscope Records

Charts

Weekly charts

Year-end charts

Certifications

References

External links

2001 soundtrack albums
Hip hop soundtracks
Gangsta rap soundtracks
Dr. Dre albums
Snoop Dogg albums
Albums produced by Eminem
Albums produced by Hi-Tek
Albums produced by DJ Pooh
Albums produced by Dr. Dre
Albums produced by Melvin "Mel-Man" Bradford
Albums produced by Focus...
Albums produced by Soopafly
Albums produced by JellyRoll
Albums produced by Timbaland
Albums produced by James Poyser
Albums produced by Bryan-Michael Cox
Interscope Records albums
Aftermath Entertainment albums
Aftermath Entertainment soundtracks
Comedy film soundtracks